= Hla complex group 22 =

Protein-coding gene in the species Homo sapiens

HCG22

Identifiers
- Aliases: HCG22, PBMUCL2, HLA complex group 22, HLA complex group 22 (gene/pseudogene)
- External IDs: OMIM: 613918; GeneCards: HCG22; OMA:HCG22 - orthologs
Orthologs
Species	Human	Mouse
Entrez	285834	n/a
Ensembl	ENSG00000228789	n/a
UniProt	E2RYF7	n/a
RefSeq (mRNA)	NM_001348249	n/a
RefSeq (protein)	NP_001335178	n/a
Location (UCSC)	n/a	n/a
PubMed search		n/a
- Wikidata
View/Edit Human

HLA complex group 22 is a protein that in humans is encoded by the HCG22 gene.
